Samy Molcho (born 24 May 1936) is an Israeli mime and an expert in body language communication. He was professor at the University of Music and Performing Arts and at Max Reinhardt Seminar in Vienna, Austria until 2004.

He studied dance and mime in Israel. From 1952 he was a dancer at the city theatre of Jerusalem. In 1956 he became a solo dancer (modern dance) in Tel Aviv. In 1960 his first mime performance took place, doing his last tour as a mime in 1987. Since then he has been concentrating on body language communication, publishing several books and has held many workshops. He is a practitioner and exponent of the Barrault-Marceau classical style of mime.

He is now a citizen of Austria. He has been married since 1978 and has four sons.

Biography
Samy Molcho, born 1936 in Tel Aviv, has added purely psychological and dramatic elements to the art of mime. As a delegate in the frame of cultural exchange, he successfully represented Austria in many countries. Since 1978 he has been married to German-born Haya Heinrich. He has four sons, Nuriel, Elior, Ilan and Nadiv. Since 1980 Samy Molcho has been teaching at the International Summer Academy for Mime and well as the techniques of mime in Israel. He graduated from an actor's school as well as from a seminar for directors and drama and was – from 1952 – dancer at the Jerusalem Dance Theatre of Rina Nikowa. From 1956 he was solo dancer for modern dance in Tel Aviv.

He worked as an actor at the Cameri Theatre and at the Israeli National Theatre Habimah. 1960 he had his first one-man mime performance in Tel Aviv.

Samy Molcho has performed in theatres all over the world, including the Piccolo Teatro in Milano, Akademietheater in Vienna, Royal Opera in Stockholm, Schiller Theater in Berlin, Royal Court in London, Royal Schouwburg in Amsterdam, Civic Theatre in Johannesburg, Palacio de Bellas Artes in Mexico, Queen Elizabeth Playhouse in Vancouver and the Schauspielhaus in Zurich.

Since that time he has performed in over 50 different countries on four continents. He was invited to perform at festivals like the Holland-Festival, Viennese Festival, Spoleto, the festival weeks of Zurich, the Israel Festival for Music and Drama and others.

Samy Molcho created the first Mimo-vision for the Austrian TV, which was awarded with the first prize at the International TV Festival in Prague (1964).

Work 
1963
 Choreography for the ballet "Berschit" (At the Beginning) for the German Ballet-Ensemble, which was recorded from the German TV after a huge success in Germany and on an international tour.

1964
 Director of the German world premiere of J. Genet's "The Negroes".
 Choreography and directing motion for H. Zusaneck's "World Theatre", which was shown in Vienna on the occasion of the 75th anniversary of the Burgtheater.

1965
 Second Mimo-Version as the Austrian contribution for the Golden Rose of Montreux, in which Samy Molcho played 37 different characters – the "Do-It-Yourself-Show".

With this show, Austria gained the acknowledgement and the honour of the critics. UNESCO ordered a thesis from Samy Molcho about his Mimo-vision (1965), which was the theme for the International Congress of Mime and Dance on TV in Salzburg.

1966
 Directs E. Ionesco's "The Chairs" and N. Gogol's "The Gamblers"

1967
 Another Mimo-Vision for the Austrian TV, "Sorry, don't have time", adapted from the Time Destruction Manifest by Leherb.

1968
 Directs E. Kishon's "Wedding Certificate" in Vienna.
 Acts in and directs in Wincelberg's "Kataki" in South Africa. This production was awarded with the Critic's Price for best production of 1968

1972
 Director for the musical "Godspell" for the productions in Germany and Switzerland.

1973
 Director for "Waiting for Godot" in Bremen and Handke's "The Ward Wants to be Guardian".
 Together with Ronconi, Choreography and directing motion in "The birds" at the Wiener Burgtheater.

1974
 Director of the musical "Who knows Jürgen Beck" in Münster.
 Director of the show "Kikerikiste" for the German TV.

1975
 Director "August, August" in Münster.

1976
 Director of the musical "Showboat" with Mary Ross in the leading part.
 Director of Goldoni's "Servant of two Masters" for the Festival in Friesach.

1977
 Director of Goldoni's "Venetian Twins" at the Ensemble Theatre in Vienna.
 Vocation for teaching at the Academy of Music and Acting at the Max-Reinhardt-Seminar in Vienna.
 Manager of his own school for mimes in Vienna.

1978
 Director of the world premiere of Arik Brauer's musical "Seven at one blow" on the occasion of the Viennese Festival Weeks.

1979
 Director of the German world premiere of Arrabal's political comedy "Steal A Little Billion From Me" at the Städtischen Bühnen Münster.
 Director of the opera "Giovanni Battista" by Alessandro Stradella at the Stadttheater St. Gallen.

1980
 Director of the opera "Giovanni Battista" at the Stadttheater Bern.
 Producer of the Baroque Festival at the court of Max II Emanuel on the occasion of the 800th anniversary of the House of Wittelsbach.
 On the occasion of the Munich Opera Festival 1980 "I Trionfi di Baviera" at the Alte Residenztheater and the Cuvilliestheater in Munich.
 Director of Goldoni's "Servant of Two Masters" at the Stadttheater Aachen.
 Began to hold body language lectures and seminars all over the world, including at the European Management Symposium in Davos, seminars for multinational companies, as guest lecturer at the Austrian Diplomatic Academy, at the Institute for Psychosomatic Research, in front of therapists, doctors, airliners, insurance companies etc.

1983
 Production of the opera "The Gardener for Love" by Wolfgang Amadeus Mozart at the Städtischen Bühne Hagen.

1984
 Director of A. Schnitzler's mime "The Veil of Pirette" for the Biennale in Venice.

1985
 Director of the "Caucasian Chalk Circle" at the Landesbühne in Wilhelmshafen; he was awarded with the first prize for directing.

1986
 He participated in the TV-production "A long, silent way", a German-Czech co-production about the classical mime, starring Marcel Marceau, Ladislav Fialka and Jean-Louis Barault.

1987
 Mime-Farewell Tour through Liechtenstein, Switzerland, Germany, Israel and Austria

1995
 Video "Body Language" is published by the publishing house MODERNE INDUSTRIE.

1996
 Director of the tour production "I'll Get Off And Produce My Own Show", starring Anja Kruse.

1997
 Video "Body Language of Children" published by the MVG publishing house.

1998
 CD-DOM "A-Z about Body Language" published by Navigo.

2006
 Admission into the German Speakers Hall of Fame

Publications 

 1983: Body Language ( MOSAIK)
 1988: Body Language as Dialogue and Magic of Silence (MOSAIK)
 1990: Partnership and Body Language (MOSAIK)
 1992: Body Language of Children (MOSAIK)
 1995: All about Body-Language (MOSAIK)
 2003: Body Language of Celebrities (Random House/Bertelsmann, Munich)
 2005: Body Language of Success and Body Language of Children (Ariston, Munich)
 2007: Samy Molcho ...And A Drop of Eternity (Amalthea, Vienna)
 2008: The 1 x1 of Body Language of Children (Heinrich Hugendubel, Kreuzlingen/Munich)
 2009: Embrace me, but do not touch me – Body language of relationships of nearness and distance (Ariston, Munich)

Decorations and awards
 1987: Silver Medal for Service to the City of Vienna
 1996: Austrian Cross of Honour for Science and Art, 1st class
 2004: Grand Decoration of Honour in Silver for Services to the Republic of Austria
 2006: Entry into the German Speakers Hall of Fame
 2008: IIR Excellence Award
 2008: Golden Medal of Honour for Services to the City of Vienna

References

External links 
  (German)

Israeli mimes
1936 births
Living people
Austrian male dancers
Dancers from Vienna
Israeli male dancers
Academic staff of the University of Music and Performing Arts Vienna
Israeli emigrants to Austria
People from Tel Aviv
Recipients of the Austrian Cross of Honour for Science and Art, 1st class
Recipients of the Grand Decoration for Services to the Republic of Austria